San Jacinto Peak (often designated Mount San Jacinto) is a  peak in the San Jacinto Mountains, in Riverside County, California. Lying within Mount San Jacinto State Park it is the highest both in the range and the county, and serves as the southern border of the San Gorgonio Pass. Naturalist John Muir wrote of San Jacinto Peak, "The view from San Jacinto is the most sublime spectacle to be found anywhere on this earth!"

San Jacinto Peak is one of the most topographically prominent peaks in the United States, and is ranked the sixth most prominent peak in the 48 contiguous states. According to John W. Robinson and Bruce D. Risher, authors of The San Jacintos, "No Southern California hiker worth his salt would miss climbing 'San Jack' at least once."

It plays host to the famous Cactus to Clouds Trail.

Geography 
To the east of San Jacinto, the  peak towers over the city of Palm Springs (elevation 479 ft; 146 m); to the west, it borders the mountain community of Idyllwild (elevation 5,413 ft; 1,650 m). The peak is also frequently called Mount San Jacinto. This is one of the largest gains in elevation over such a small horizontal distance in the contiguous United States.

From the peak, San Gorgonio Mountain can be seen across the San Gorgonio Pass. Also easily visible below is the Coachella Valley and the Salton Sea. In addition, much of the Inland Empire, including Ontario to the west, can be viewed on a clear day.

Named after Hyacinth of Caesarea, Mount San Jacinto is one of the "Four Saints," a name occasionally used to describe the high points of the four mountains over 10,000 feet named for Catholic saints in Southern California: San Jacinto Peak, Mount San Gorgonio (high point of the San Bernardino Mountains), San Bernardino Peak, and Mount San Antonio (high point of the San Gabriel Mountains).

History 
The peak is known to the Cahuilla Native Americans as I a kitch (or Aya Kaich), meaning "smooth cliffs." It is regarded as the home of Dakush, the meteor and legendary founder of the Cahuilla.

In 1878, a Wheeler Survey topographical party led by rancher Charles Thomas of Garner Valley climbed the peak. The Wheeler Survey gave the mountain the name "San Jacinto Peak" (rather than "Mt. San Jacinto" or "San Jacinto Mountain.")
The earliest recorded ascent of the peak was made in September, 1874 by "F. of Riverside," according to a description of his ascent in the San Diego Union. The first successful ascent of the difficult northeast escarpment was made in 1931 by Floyd Vernoy and Stewart White of Riverside.
The peak is flanked by Jean Peak  and Marion Mountain . These peaks were named in 1897 by USGS topographer Edmund Taylor Perkins Jr. Perkins named Jean Peak for his sweetheart and future bride, Jean Waters of Plumas County, whom he married in 1903. He named Marion Mountain after Marion Kelly, his girlfriend, a teacher for the Indian Bureau at the Morongo Valley Reservation. According to a local legend, Perkins spent the summer of 1897 deciding which woman to marry while he conducted his topographical survey of San Jacinto Peak and its environs.

Nearby Cornell Peak is named for Cornell University, the alma mater of geologist Robert T. Hill. Perkins and Hill were camping in Round Valley when Hill remarked that the peak looked like the campanile tower at Cornell. Perkins later named the peak Cornell Peak.

The 1931 race was won by Tom Humphreys, a Hopi, in 3:36:30. Humphreys won the race again in 1932 with a time of 3:12. Near the summit of San Jacinto peak is a stone hut that was built in 1935 by the Civilian Conservation Corps under the direction of Serbo-Croatian immigrant Alfred Zarubicka, a stonemason known in Idyllwild as "Zubi."

Hiking 

San Jacinto Peak is easily accessible, as many trails penetrate the Santa Rosa and San Jacinto Mountains National Monument. From there, one can easily climb the mountain face via trails.
Another route is to hike the Marion Mountain Trail from near the mountain town of Idyllwild.
There is a naturally reproducing but introduced population of Sequoiadendrons planted in 1974 located here hundreds of miles from native populations. 
This trail has no water sources until , so early starts are advised to avoid the temperatures which often soar above .

See also
 List of highest points in California by county
 List of Ultras of the United States
 Tahquitz (spirit)

References

External links

 
 
 
 
 
 
 

Mountains of Riverside County, California
Religious places of the indigenous peoples of North America
San Jacinto Mountains
Mountains of Southern California
San Gorgonio Pass